The thirteenth series of the British television drama series Grange Hill began broadcasting on 2 January 1990, before ending on 9 March 1990 on BBC One. The series follows the lives of the staff and pupils of the eponymous school, an inner-city London comprehensive school. It consists of twenty episodes.

It marked a change from earlier series with the introduction of a new theme tune and incidental music.

Cast and characters

Pupils

Teachers

Episodes

{| class="wikitable" style="width:100%;"
|-
! style="background-color: #333333; color:white"| No.
! style="background: #333333; color:white"| Episode
! style="background: #333333; color:white"| Writer
! style="background: #333333; color:white"| Director
! style="background: #333333; color:white"| Original airdate
|-
| align="center"| 1
| align="center"| Episode One
| align="center"| Barry Purchese
| align="center"| John Smith
| align="center"| 2 January 1990
|-
| style="background:white" colspan="5" |Jacko's dog causes problems on the first day of term. The new Deputy Head at the school imposes his discipline on Mauler and Ted.
|- style="background:#333333; height:2px"
| colspan="5" |
|-
| align="center"| 2
| align="center"| Episode Two
| align="center"| John Smith
| align="center"| John Smith
| align="center"| 5 January 1990
|-
| style="background:white" colspan="5" |Neil Timpson tricks Locko. Tegs is still acting strangely around Justine.
|- style="background:#333333; height:2px"
| colspan="5" |
|-
| align="center"| 3
| align="center"| Episode Three
| align="center"| Chris Ellis
| align="center"| John Smith
| align="center"| 9 January 1990
|-
| style="background:white" colspan="5" |Mr. Hargreaves continues to get on the nerves of his fellow staff members. Georgina is finding it hard to get things moving with Mike Bentley.
|- style="background:#333333; height:2px"
| colspan="5" |
|-
| align="center"| 4
| align="center"| Episode Four
| align="center"| Margaret Simpson
| align="center"| John Smith
| align="center"| 12 January 1990
|-
| style="background:white" colspan="5" |Georgina and her friends get some glamour photos taken hoping that they will appear in a magazine. Robbie and Mike find themselves involved in a pub fight.
|- style="background:#333333; height:2px"
| colspan="5" |
|-
| align="center"| 5
| align="center"| Episode Five
| align="center"| Margaret Simpson
| align="center"| Andrew Whitman
| align="center"| 16 January 1990
|-
| style="background:white" colspan="5" |Tegs and Matthew end up doing a spot of breaking and entering. Mrs. Monroe ends up getting locked in a cupboard at the school.
|- style="background:#333333; height:2px"
| colspan="5" |
|-
| align="center"| 6
| align="center"| Episode Six 
| align="center"| Kay Trainor
| align="center"| Andrew Whitman
| align="center"| 19 January 1990
|-
| style="background:white" colspan="5" |Mike finally asks Georgina out on a date. Ronnie becomes involved in an animal rights protest outside a local chemist. Mike and Georgina see Calley with her new older boyfriend.
|- style="background:#333333; height:2px"
| colspan="5" |
|-
| align="center"| 7
| align="center"| Episode Seven
| align="center"| Kay Trainer
| align="center"| Andrew Whitman
| align="center"| 23 January 1990
|-
| style="background:white" colspan="5" |Aichaa learns that one of her pictures is going to be used in the magazine.
|- style="background:#333333; height:2px"
| colspan="5" |
|-
| align="center"| 8
| align="center"| Episode Eight
| align="center"| David Angus
| align="center"| Andrew Whitman
| align="center"| 26 January 1990
|-
| style="background:white" colspan="5" |Ronnie tries to stop rat dissection at St. Mary's school from taking place. Mauler sells Mr. Hargreaves's photo frame to a local antiques shop.
|- style="background:#333333; height:2px"
| colspan="5" |
|-
| align="center"| 9
| align="center"| Episode Nine
| align="center"| Barry Purchese
| align="center"| Richard Kelly
| align="center"| 30 January 1990
|-
| style="background:white" colspan="5" |Neil's revenge on the T-shirt girls could end up being more deadly than he intended. Mike reads a newspaper report about the fight at the pub.
|- style="background:#333333; height:2px"
| colspan="5" |
|-
| align="center"| 10
| align="center"| Episode Ten
| align="center"| Barry Purchese
| align="center"| Richard Kelly
| align="center"| 2 February 1990
|-
| style="background:white" colspan="5" |Aichaa and Georgina go to a modelling agency to see if they can be signed up. The photo frame ends up back at the school. Tegs pays his mother a visit.
|- style="background:#333333; height:2px"
| colspan="5" |
|-
| align="center"| 11
| align="center"| Episode Eleven
| align="center"| Margaret Simpson
| align="center"| Richard Kelly
| align="center"| 6 February 1990
|-
| style="background:white" colspan="5" |Matthew's home life continues to get worse.
|- style="background:#333333; height:2px"
| colspan="5" |
|-
| align="center"| 12
| align="center"| Episode Twelve
| align="center"| Margaret Simpson
| align="center"| Richard Kelly
| align="center"| 9 February 1990 
|-
| style="background:white" colspan="5" |Mike decides it would be best to drop out of the athletic trials so that he can avoid having his picture taken. The first year pupils make chilli con carne to sell as an alternative to the hunger lunches at the school. Julie keeps following Georgina.
|- style="background:#333333; height:2px"
| colspan="5" |
|-
| align="center"| 13
| align="center"| Episode Thirteen
| align="center"| Sarah Daniels
| align="center"| Riitta-Leena Lynn
| align="center"| 13 February 1990
|-
| style="background:white" colspan="5" |Mike ends up taking part in the race and tells Georgina about the fight. Aichaa goes out on a date with Robbie. Matthew ends up taking some drastic action.
|- style="background:#333333; height:2px"
| colspan="5" |
|-
| align="center"| 14
| align="center"| Episode Fourteen
| align="center"| Sarah Daniels
| align="center"| Riitta-Leena Lynn
| align="center"| 16 February 1990
|-
| style="background:white" colspan="5" | Matthew's arson attempt sees his problems not improving. The T-shirt business comes to an end. Jacko's dog is found.
|- style="background:#333333; height:2px"
| colspan="5" |
|-
| align="center"| 15
| align="center"| Episode Fifteen
| align="center"| Kevin Hood
| align="center"| Riitta-Leena Lynn
| align="center"| 20 February 1990
|-
| style="background:white" colspan="5" | Justine finds her reputation is in tatters. Ronnie discovers where Calley's boyfriend works. Robbie and Aichaa go to see a football match but trouble breaks out.
|- style="background:#333333; height:2px"
| colspan="5" |
|-
| align="center"| 16
| align="center"| Episode Sixteen
| align="center"| Kevin Hood
| align="center"| Riitta-Leena Lynn
| align="center"| 23 February 1990
|-
| style="background:white" colspan="5" | Mr. Hankin's Aunt Camelia helps him to demonstrate acoustics. Calley steals her boyfriend's electronic card to get Ronnie, Georgina and herself into the laboratory.
|- style="background:#333333; height:2px"
| colspan="5" |
|-
| align="center"| 17
| align="center"| Episode Seventeen
| align="center"| Chris Ellis
| align="center"| Richard Kelly
| align="center"| 27 February 1990
|-
| style="background:white" colspan="5" |Calley, Ronnie and Georgina are allowed to leave. Georgina's first modelling assignments aren't what she was expecting.
|- style="background:#333333; height:2px"
| colspan="5" |
|-
| align="center"| 18
| align="center"| Episode Eighteen
| align="center"| Barry Purchese
| align="center"| Richard Kelly
| align="center"| 2 March 1990
|-
| style="background:white" colspan="5" | Alice and Becky end up spending a morning at a health club. Matthew has his day in court. Robbie and Mike decide to tell the police what they know about the fight.
|- style="background:#333333; height:2px"
| colspan="5" |
|-
| align="center"| 19
| align="center"| Episode Nineteen
| align="center"| David Angus
| align="center"| Richard Kelly
| align="center"| 6 March 1990
|-
| style="background:white" colspan="5" | Neil ends up being taught a lesson. Rod's time as a caretaker at the school comes to an end. Mr. Robson arranges a surprise for Mike.
|- style="background:#333333; height:2px"
| colspan="5" |
|-
| align="center"| 20
| align="center"| Episode Twenty
| align="center"| David Angus
| align="center"| Richard Kelly
| align="center"| 9 March 1990
|-
| style="background:white" colspan="5" | Mike and Robbie go to court and Mike still manages to run the most important race of his life.
|- style="background:#333333; height:2px"
| colspan="5" |
|-
|}

Release History
The thirteenth series of Grange Hill has never been released on DVD as of 2022

In December 2022 ‘’ITV’’ announced that the thirteenth series of ‘’Grange Hill’’ will be available on its streaming platform ITVx as part of its ‘’BritBox’’ content in January 2023

Notes
Jacko's dog 'Gruff' was played by Rosie the Jack Russell from Surrey. She loved working on set particularly when she found peoples bags to rummage through that were left on the floor off set.

References

1990 British television seasons
Grange Hill